The EMU-320 is an upcoming South Korean high-speed electrical multiple unit train manufactured by Hyundai Rotem and operated by Korail and SR Corporation.

History
In September 2016, Korail held a contest for the public to decide the design of the new models. After the development of HEMU-430X, Hyundai-Rotem and Korail signed an agreement in December 2016 for supplying high speed trains that are electric multiple units, the first of its kind in South Korea in commercial service (the HEMU-430X is also an electric multiple unit, but it is not for service and mass production). The order was for two variants: 2 eight-car EMU-320 units (with an operating speed of 320 km/h) and 19 six-car EMU-260 units, to be delivered around 2020–2021. In 2017, a mockup of the chosen design was exhibited to the public to promote the sister train (EMU-260) and receive feedback.

On March 28, 2022, it was reported that the EMU-320 consisting of 25 units for Korail and 19 units for SR Corporation are now scheduled to be delivered from December 2023. Elements of the EMU-320 had to be re-designed due to serious concerns about excessive noise levels in the cab and passenger compartments, a key reason for its delay. Measures including improving the pantograph's shape and adding sound insulation to the ceiling and floor have been taken to reduce noise levels. Hyundai-Rotem is to pay 19 billion won in damages for the delay in delivery.

Design
Technology incorporated in these trains is dereived from the experimental HEMU-430X train previously tested by Korail. The EMU-320 will feature the same design as KTX-Eum trains , however the formation will consists of eight cars as suppose to six cars. Unlike KTX trains, the EMU-320 uses distributed traction with driving trailers at each end and six powered intermediate cars as opposed to traction heads configuration.

The train can accelerate from 0 to 300 km/h (0 to 186 mph) in 230 seconds, in contrast to 316 seconds for the KTX-Sancheon.

Interior
Unlike KTX trains, the seats on EMU-320 features more leg room, wider armrests, USB ports, wireless charging pads, and entertainment display similar to the inflight entertainment system found on aircraft. In addition, every seat is aligned with a window.

See also
 List of high speed trains
 HEMU-430X
 EMU-260
 Rail transport in South Korea

References

High-speed trains of South Korea
Rolling stock of South Korea
Hyundai Rotem multiple units
25 kV AC multiple units